This is a list of the top ten bridge players in the world according to the World Bridge Federation 'Open Ranking' by Master Points (MPs) as maintained by the World Bridge Federation. Master Points earned more than one year ago are reduced annually by 15%. The list also includes the player's lifetime accumulation of Placing Points (PPs).  Accordingly, the table data is time sensitive and represents the standings based upon their recent performance as current on the WBF website as of July 30, 2022.
 

References

Contract bridge people